Sharada Mukherjee (1919–2007) was an Indian socialite and politician who was member of Lok Sabha in 1960s, and later served as Governor of the states of Andhra Pradesh and Gujarat.

Biography

Sharada was born into a Maharashtrian family as Sharada Pandit on 24 February 1919. Her paternal uncle Ranjit S Pandit was married to Vijayalakshmi Pandit, India's first Prime Minister Jawaharlal Nehru's sister. Her mother Saraswatibai Pandit's sister was legendary actress and film personality Durga Khote. She met Subroto Mukerjee, who became the first Indian Air Chief Marshal later and belonged to one of the most distinguished families of Bengal in 1937 in Mumbai. They got married in 1939 and had a son. After the untimely death of her husband in 1960, she entered politics. She was member of 3rd and 4th Lok Sabha, 1962 to 1971, from Ratnagiri (Lok Sabha constituency) of  Maharashtra, representing Congress Party. She did not contest 1971 election. 

Sharada Mukherjee was governor of Andhra Pradesh from May 1977 to August 1978, and governor of Gujarat from 1978 to 1983. She died in 2007.

References

External links 

1919 births
Date of death missing
India MPs 1962–1967
India MPs 1967–1970
20th-century Indian women politicians
20th-century Indian politicians
Governors of Andhra Pradesh
Governors of Gujarat
Lok Sabha members from Maharashtra
Marathi politicians
People from Rajkot
People from Ratnagiri
Politicians from Mumbai
Women in Gujarat politics
Women in Maharashtra politics
Women state governors of India
Indian National Congress politicians from Andhra Pradesh
Indian National Congress politicians from Gujarat
Indian National Congress politicians from Maharashtra